Nord-Østerdal District Court was a district court in Innlandet county, Norway. The court was located in Tynset. It included the northern part of Østerdalen, including the municipalities of Alvdal, Engerdal, Folldal, Os, Rendalen, Stor-Elvdal, Tolga, and Tynset. Cases from this court could be appealed to Eidsivating Court of Appeal.

The court was led by a chief judge and several other judges. The court was a court of first instance. Its judicial duties were mainly to settle criminal cases and to resolve civil litigation as well as bankruptcy. The administration and registration tasks of the court included death registration, issuing certain certificates, performing duties of a notary public, and officiating civil wedding ceremonies. Cases from this court were heard by a combination of professional judges and lay judges.

History
On 1 July 1837, the old Østerdalen District Court was divided into two: Nord-Østerdal District Court in the north and Sør-Østerdal District Court in the south. On 26 April 2021, the court was merged with the Sør-Østerdal District Court and the Hedmarken District Court to create the new Østre Innlandet District Court.

References

Defunct district courts of Norway
Organisations based in Tynset
1837 establishments in Norway
2021 disestablishments in Norway